Nykøbing FC is a Danish professional association football club based in Nykøbing Falster on Falster. The club competes in Danish 1st Division, the second tier of the Danish football league system, and plays its home games at the Lollands Bank Park.

History

Mergers (1994–2013)
Nykøbing FC was formed on 1 July 2013 by a merger of regional teams B.1901 and B.1921. The move was initiated with the goal of developing youth football in Guldborgsund Kommune in order to strengthen the first team and thereby retain divisional status. Before taking the name Nykøbing FC, the club was known as Nykøbing Falster Alliancen (NFA), which was also a superstructure between B.1901 and B.1921 founded on 1 January 1994. Later on, between 2006 and 2013, this club also went under the name Lolland Falster Alliancen (LFA). 

Lolland Falster Alliancen had, before the foundation of Nykøbing FC, had a tumultuous existence between the second tier and third tier. On 18 June 2006, their 4–3 defeat to Lyngby Boldklub in the last game of the season resulted in relegation to the third tier, after having spent three years in the second tier. However, they spent just one season at this level, and were promoted back to the second division after beating KB 5–0 on 3 June 2007.

Superliga 2020 (2015–present)
In 2015, two years after the launch of the new merger between B.1901 and B.1921, Nykøbing FC launched the project Superliga 2020, with a declared goal of promotion to the Danish Superliga by 2020. The project was launched when Danish celebrities - chef Claus Meyer, comedian Mick Øgendahl and former footballer Claus Jensen - invested millions in the club and became major shareholders. This vision was readjusted in 2019, instead targeting promotion to the Danish Superliga by 2022 with 50% of the team being homegrown. On 7 January 2020, Claus Jensen combined his role as investor in the club with a new role as club manager, while head coach Brian Rasmussen assumed the position of first team coach.

Nykøbing achieved national prominence in 2021 when they knocked top-flight FC Copenhagen out of the Danish Cup with a shocking 3–0 win.

Season to season

4 seasons in Danish 1st Division
3 seasons in Danish 2nd Division

Current squad

Out on loan

Current technical staff

Stadium
Nykøbing FC play its home matches at the Nykøbing Falster Idrætspark named CM Arena for sponsorship reasons. It has a capacity of approximately 10,000 and was inaugurated in 1987.

Famous players
Note: this list includes players that have appeared in at least 100 league games and/or have reached international status.

Coaches

References

External links
Official club website

Football clubs in Denmark
Association football clubs established in 1994
1994 establishments in Denmark